Carate Brianza is a town and comune in the province of Monza and Brianza, Lombardy, northern Italy.

History 
The history of Carate Brianza dates back to the Stone Age, as shown by a discovery made of carved rocks that are now preserved in the Archaeological Museum of Milan.

The Lombard Queen Theodolinda built in this town a tower, which later was turned into the bell tower for the main church. After the 10th century, a wall was built around the town to protect it from barbarian attacks. The Middle Ages was characterized by the spreading of the Christianity, with the construction of five churches and a hospital.

During the 19th century   jurist and philosopher Gian Domenico Romagnosi lived in Carate.

Main sights
Villa Cusani Confalonieri- originally the site of a medieval castle; the present shape was acquired over the 18th and 19th century. It now houses the town library and scenic park, open to the public. 
Villa La Rovella - Neoclassical villa an oratory in the frazione of Agliate
Sant' Ambrogio e Simpliciano - 19th-century parish church in town center, near the 18th-century statue of Sant'Anatalone, which has been restored recently.
San Pietro and San Paolo, Agliate - Basilica built in Romanesque style.
Oratorio di Santa Maria Maddalena, Carate Brianza - small 15th-century church adjacent to Villa Cusani Confalonieri

See also 
 Brianza
 Simone Cantoni
 Lambro
 Gian Domenico Romagnosi

References 

Municipalities of the Province of Monza and Brianza